The Li Ka-shing Family refers to a wealthy family based in Hong Kong but with business interests worldwide. The family empire was started by Li Ka-shing, a wealthy Hong Kong entrepreneur who has long been Hong Kong's wealthiest individual and one of the wealthiest in the world. While Li Ka-shing and his family are best known for CK Hutchison Holdings and CK Asset Holdings, they are also associated with a number of other businesses outside of CK including (but not limited to) Pacific Century Group.

Notable family members 

Li Ka-shing (b. 1928); entrepreneur, philanthropist, and founder of CK Hutchison Holdings and CK Asset Holdings, among others
 Victor Li (b. 1964); chairman of CK Hutchison Holdings and CK Asset Holdings, among others
 Michelle Li (b. 1996); director of the Li Ka Shing Foundation
 Richard Li (b. 1966); entrepreneur and founder of Pacific Century Group

Associated businesses 

 CK Asset Holdings
 Greene King
 CK Hutchison Holdings
 A.S. Watson Group
 CK Infrastructure Holdings
 Husky Energy
Hutchison Port Holdings
 Horizons Ventures
 Pacific Century Group
FWD Group
PCCW
TOM Group

References 

Hong Kong billionaires